The 1994 Colorado gubernatorial election was held on November 8, 1994 to select the governor of the state of Colorado. Although Colorado voters passed a term limits ballot measure in 1990 limiting the governors to two terms, it included a provision for Roy Romer, the Democratic incumbent, to be able to run for reelection for a third term. The Republican nominee, Chairman of the Colorado Republican Party, Bruce D. Benson, lost by a margin of nearly 18 percent.

Democratic Primary
Incumbent governor Roy Romer ran unopposed in the Democratic primary.

Republican Primary
Bruce D. Benson, Chairman of the Colorado Republican Party
Mike Bird
Dick Sargent
 George P. Carouthen (write-in)

General election

References

Gubernatorial
1994
1994 United States gubernatorial elections